The 1993–94 Tulsa Golden Hurricane men's basketball team represented the University of Tulsa as a member of the Missouri Valley Conference during the 1993–94 college basketball season. The Golden Hurricane played their home games at the Tulsa Convention Center. Led by head coach Tubby Smith, they finished the season 23–8 overall and 15–3 in conference play to finish atop the MVC standings. After losing in the semifinal round of the MVC tournament, the team defeated UCLA and Oklahoma State to reach the Sweet Sixteen of the NCAA tournament, before falling to eventual National champion Arkansas in the Midwest Regional semifinals.

Roster

Schedule and results

|-
!colspan=9 style=| Regular season

|-
!colspan=9 style=| MVC Tournament

|-
!colspan=9 style=| NCAA Tournament

Rankings

Awards and honors
Gary Collier – MVC Player of the Year

NBA draft

References

Tulsa Golden Hurricane men's basketball seasons
Tulsa
Tulsa Golden Hurricane men's b
Tulsa Golden Hurricane men's b
Tulsa